Carlos Mejía Godoy (born June 27, 1943) is a Nicaraguan musician (accordion), composer and singer. He was born in Somoto, Madriz. Son of Carlos Mejía Fajardo and María Elsa Godoy, his brother Luis Enrique Mejía Godoy, three years younger than he is, is also an acclaimed and much-loved musician. Carlos and Luis Enrique were pivotal in the New Song Movement in Central America beginning in the 1970s. They were both honored with Nicaragua's highest cultural distinction, the Order of Rubén Darío.

Biography 
Carlos started his career as 'Corporito' on the radio station 'Radio Corporacion', where he would daily compose songs that would rain ridicule and scorn on all politicians and political parties.

Many of his songs, performed with his band los de Palacagüina, became associated with the Sandinista movement as songs of the workers and revolutionaries. He even composed a Mass for the working class, the Misa Campesina Nicaragüense. Many of his songs during the late 1970s gave instructions on how to use, assemble, and disassemble the rifles people were capturing from dictator Somoza's National Guard during street battles.

One of his biggest achievements of his career as a songwriter came in 1977 when the song Quincho Barrilete (Quincho, the boy of the little barrel), composed by himself and performed by Eduardo Gonzalez won the sixth edition of the OTI Festival. A victory which is still remembered by many Nicaraguans.

In 1980, Carlos Mejía Godoy y los de Palancagüina were internally selected by Televicentro Nicaragua to represent their country in the OTI Festival in 1980 with their song La chavalita de España (The little girl from Spain). This song marked the return of Nicaragua to the event after two years of absence because of the turbulent Nicaraguan Revolution. Their competing song, which although was one of the favourites, ended in a respectable but disappointing tenth place with 15 points.

He was the vice-presidential running mate of Edmundo Jarquín of the Sandinista Renovation Movement (MRS) in the November 2006 presidential election. They came in fourth place.

Mejía Godoy is the father of the United States Army deserter and author Camilo Mejía, as well as the musicians Carlos Luis 'La Bujilla' Mejía and Augusto 'El Negro' Mejía from the Grammy-nominated Nicaraguan ensemble La Cuneta Son Machín.

Since 2018 he has lived in Costa Rica. As one of president Daniel Ortega's fiercest critics, he fears being killed.

In February 2021, Mejía Godoy condemned a proposed law that would declare the songs of the Nicaraguan National Guard, as Heritage of the Nation, considering it confiscatory of his work.

Discography
Albums

Contributing artist
His music has been featured on several compilations of songs of Nicaragua and the Nicaraguan revolution: Songs of the Nicaraguan Revolution, Vol.1-2, and Nicaraguita: Music from Nicaragua. He was also featured in The Rough Guide to the Music of Central America (2002, World Music Network). Mejía Godoy was featured on the title track from La Cuneta Son Machín's Cañambuco (2017, Round Whirled Records).

Jefferson Starship recorded one of his songs for their 2008 album Jefferson's Tree of Liberty

References 

1943 births
Living people
People from Madriz Department
Nicaraguan musicians
Nicaraguan composers
Male composers
Sandinista Renovation Movement politicians